The rivière au Tonnerre (English: Tonnerre River) is a tributary of the Normandin River, flowing into the unorganized territory of Lac-Ashuapmushuan, Quebec in the Regional County Municipality (RCM) of Le Domaine-du-Roy, in the administrative region of Saguenay-Lac-Saint-Jean, in Quebec, in Canada.

The Tonnerre River flows entirely in the Township of Ducharme. Forestry is the main economic activity of this valley; recreational tourism activities, second.

The route 167 (northwesterly) connecting Chibougamau to Saint-Félicien, Quebec cuts the middle of the Tonnerre River. The
Canadian National Railway runs along this road.

The surface of the Tonnerre River is usually frozen from early November to mid-May, however, safe ice circulation is generally from mid-November to mid-April.

Geography

Toponymy 
The term "Normandin" is a family name of French origin.

The toponym "Rivière au Tonnerre" was formalized on June 8, 1971, at the Commission de toponymie du Québec.

Notes and references

See also 

Le Domaine-du-Roy Regional County Municipality